This is the list of cathedrals in Uruguay sorted by denomination.

Catholic
Cathedrals of the Roman Catholic Church in Uruguay:

 Cathedral of Our Lady of Guadalupe in Canelones
 Cathedral Basilica Sanctuary of Our Lady of the Thirty-Three in Florida
 Cathedral of St. Ferdinand in Maldonado
 Cathedral of Our Lady of the Pillar and St. Raphael in Melo
 Cathedral of Our Lady of Mercy in Mercedes
 Cathedral of the Immaculate Conception in Minas
 Cathedral of the Immaculate Conception, St. Philip and St. James in Montevideo
 Cathedral of St. John the Baptist in Salto
 Cathedral Basilica of St. Joseph in San José de Mayo
 Cathedral of St. Fructuosus in Tacuarembó
Cathedrals of the Armenian Catholic Church:
 Cathedral of Our Lady of Bzommar in Montevideo

Anglican
Cathedrals of the Anglican Church of the Southern Cone of America:
 Cathedral of The Most Holy Trinity in Montevideo

Armenian Apostolic
Cathedrals of the Armenian Apostolic Church:
 St. Nerses Shnorhali Church in Montevideo

See also
List of cathedrals
List of Catholic churches in Uruguay
List of Roman Catholic dioceses in Uruguay

References

 
Uruguay
Cathedrals
Cathedrals